Ophir is a census-designated place in Tooele County, Utah, United States. It is part of the Salt Lake City, Utah Metropolitan Statistical Area. The population was 23 at the 2000 census, a decrease of two from the 1990 figure of 25.

History
Ophir was named for the nearby canyon and mining district, where gold, silver-lead deposits were found in the 1860s. The mining district was named for the biblical Ophir, from where King Solomon brought back gold to Israel. In 1911, zinc was recovered and various mining operations continued until 1959. 

Prior to 2016, Ophir was one of the smallest incorporated municipalities in Utah. However, after a town government could not be formed from the remaining citizens in 2016, the town was disincorporated.

Geography
According to the United States Census Bureau, the town has a total area of 0.2 square mile (0.4 km), all land.

Demographics

At the 2000 census there were 23 people, 10 households, and 6 families in the town. The population density was 143.0 people per square mile (55.5/km). There were 33 housing units at an average density of 205.1 per square mile (79.6/km).  The racial makeup of the town was 95.65% White and 4.35% Asian.
Of the 10 households 20.0% had children under the age of 18 living with them, 60.0% were married couples living together, and 40.0% were non-families. 40.0% of households were one person and 20.0% were one person aged 65 or older. The average household size was 2.30 and the average family size was 3.17.

The age distribution was 8.7% under the age of 18, 8.7% from 18 to 24, 8.7% from 25 to 44, 43.5% from 45 to 64, and 30.4% 65 or older. The median age was 54 years. For every 100 females, there were 109.1 males. For every 100 females age 18 and over, there were 110.0 males.

The median household income was $50,000 and the median family income  was $49,167. Males had a median income of $46,875 versus $13,750 for females. The per capita income for the town was $29,906. None of the population or families were below the poverty line.

See also

 List of cities and towns in Utah

References

External links

Census-designated places in Tooele County, Utah
Census-designated places in Utah
Salt Lake City metropolitan area
Mining communities in Utah
Populated places disestablished in 2016